Barbara Durkin is an English actress who trained at the Manchester Polytechnic School of Theatre. She made her debut in the 1987 British film Wish You Were Here, and later made television appearances in Knowing Me, Knowing You... with Alan Partridge, Boon, Brass Eye, I'm Alan Partridge, Taking the Floor, Midsomer Murders, Roger Roger, My Parents Are Aliens and Scoop.

Film

Television

References

External links 
 

Living people
English television actresses
Year of birth missing (living people)
Actresses from Manchester